Jessica Hester Hsuan ([IPA: syn hyn]; born 18 August 1970), also known as Suen Huen, is a Hong Kong actress.

Early life
Hsuan's father gave her the name Jessica, while her mother gave her the middle name Hester. She was educated in Hong Kong at Maryknoll Convent School for primary education and at Pooi To Middle School. She later boarded at Roedean School in Britain.

Hsuan graduated with a bachelor's degree in materials science and engineering from Imperial College London in 1992.

Career
Hsuan started her career in late 1992 and early 1993. Along with Maggie Cheung Ho Yee, Ada Choi, Flora Chan and Kenix Kwok, she was known as one of the top five "Fa Dans" (a term borrowed from Peking Opera for roles depicting young maidens,  and used for actresses with high popularity) of TVB from the mid-1990s to mid-2000s. She has collaborated with many TVB leading actors including Louis Koo, Wong He, Chilam Cheung, Nick Cheung, Gallen Lo, Roger Kwok, Sunny Chan, Joe Ma and Bobby Au-yeung. She won the 1999 TVB Anniversary Award for Best Actress for her role in Detective Investigation Files IV.

She changed her contract to a "per-series" in late 2006, after it was disclosed that she had not renewed her current contract.

In 2017, Hsuan played a leading role in TVB series My Unfair Lady (Chinese: 不懂撒嬌的女人). She won the My Favorite TVB Actress (also known as Malaysia's TV Queen) at the TVB Star Awards in Malaysia in 2017 for her performance in this series, her first leading actress award since 1999.

Louis Koo's film production company, One Cool Film Production, was able to acquire the rights of the series A Step into the Past in 2015 and adapt to the big screen - Back to the Past.  Production for the film officially wrapped on 7 July 2019.  Hsuan will play a role in the movie.

Frequently Acting as Hostage in TV Drama and Films
Among the TV drama and films Hsuan starred in, she was frequently "kipnapped" in the stories. This has drawn the attention of internet users in Hong Kong. Occasionally she was known as the "Queen of hostage" (人質王). Nevertheless, she always survived in the end.

Filmography

Awards and nominations
Hsuan is one of the most honored actresses in Hong Kong, with 13 Best Actress awards.

1995: Next Magazine TV Award: Top 10 Artists - Ranked #8
1999: TVB 32nd Anniversary: My Favorite Actress In A Leading Role (Detective Investigation Files IV)
2000: TVB 33rd Anniversary: My Top 10 Favorite Television Characters - Ranked #7 (A Matter of Customs)
2000: Next Magazine TV Award: Top 10 Artists - Ranked #2
2001: TVB 34th Anniversary: My Top 13 Favorite Television Characters - Ranked #9 (A Step Into The Past)
2002: TVB 35th Anniversary: My Top 12 Favorite Television Characters - Ranked #2 (Golden Faith)
2002: Next Magazine TV Award: Top 10 Artists - Ranked #2
2003: TVB 36th Anniversary: My Favorite On-Screen Partners (Jessica Hsuan & Roger Kwok - Square Pegs)
2003: TVB 36th Anniversary: My Top 12 Favorite Television Characters - Ranked #5 (Square Pegs)
2003: Next Magazine TV Award: Top 10 Artists - Ranked #1
2004: TVB 37th Anniversary: My Top 12 Favorite Television Characters - Ranked #1 (Lady Fan)
2005: Next Magazine TV Award: Top 10 Artists - Ranked #3
2005: Next Magazine TV Award: Most Elegant Artiste Award
2006: Next Magazine TV Award: Top 10 Artists - Ranked #2
2006: Next Magazine TV Award: Most Feminine Beautiful Award
2007: Asian Television Award: Best Comedy Performance by an Actress (Nominated)  
2008: I Weekly Magazine Awards Top 10 Female Artists - Ranked #1
2008: Next Magazine TV Award: Top 10 Artists - Ranked #2
2008: Sina Awards: Best Style Actress
2008: Astro Wah Lai Toi Drama Awards 2008: My Favorite Character - Ranked #6 (Dicey Business)
2015: 7th Macau International Movie Festival: Golden Lotus Award for Best Supporting Actress (The Kid from the Big Apple)
2017: TVB Star Awards Malaysia: My Favorite TVB Actress in a Leading Role (My Unfair Lady)
2017: People's Choice Television Awards: People's Choice Best Actress (My Unfair Lady) 
2017: Hong Kong Television Awards: Best Leading Actress in Drama Series (My Unfair Lady)

References

External links
Jessica Hsuan on Sina Weibo

Jessica Hsuan's official Instagram page

1970 births
Living people
Alumni of Imperial College London
Hong Kong film actresses
Hong Kong television actresses
People educated at Roedean School, East Sussex
TVB veteran actors
20th-century Hong Kong actresses
21st-century Hong Kong actresses